Northern Gateway Regional Division No. 10 or Northern Gateway Public Schools is a public school board serving Woodlands County, Lac Ste. Anne County and part of the Municipal District of Greenview No. 16.

Schools 

Whitecourt
 Pat Hardy Elementary School (PreK - 2)
 Whitecourt Central Elementary School (3-5)
 Percy Baxter Middle School (6-8)
 Hilltop Jr/Sr High School (9-12)

Valleyview
 Oscar Adolphson School (K-3)
 Harry Gray Elementary School (4-6)
 Hillside Jr/Sr High School (7-12)
 Homeland Colony School (K-9)
 Twilight Colony School (K-9)
 Valleyview Ranches Colony School (K-9)

Fox Creek
 Fox Creek School (K-12)

Mayerthorpe
 Elmer Elson Elementary School (K-6)
 Mayerthorpe Jr/Sr High School (7-12)
 Rochfort Bridge Colony School

Onoway and Area
 Darwell School (K-7)
 Grasmere School (K-7)
 Rich Valley School (K-7)
 Onoway Elementary School (K-7)
 Onoway Jr/Sr High School (8-12)

Sangudo
 Sangudo Community School (K-9)

References

External links 

School districts in Alberta
Whitecourt